Phasia barbifrons is a European species of fly in the family Tachinidae.

References

Phasiinae
Diptera of Europe
Insects described in 1887
Articles containing video clips
Taxa named by Ernst August Girschner